The 2015 Brasil Open was a tennis tournament played on indoor clay courts. It was the 15th edition of the event known as the Brasil Open, and part of the ATP World Tour 250 series of the 2015 ATP World Tour. It took place from February 9 through February 15, 2015, in São Paulo, Brazil.

Singles main-draw entrants

Seeds 

1 Rankings as of February 2, 2015.

Other entrants 
The following players received wildcards into the main draw:
 Guilherme Clezar
 Kimmer Coppejans
 João Souza

The following players received entry from the qualifying draw:
 Thiemo de Bakker
 Máximo González
 Guido Pella
 Luca Vanni

The following player received entry as a lucky loser:
 Facundo Bagnis

Withdrawals 
Before the tournament
 Feliciano López → replaced by Facundo Bagnis

Retirements 
 Facundo Bagnis

Doubles main-draw entrants

Seeds 

1 Rankings are as of February 2, 2015.

Other entrants 
The following pairs received wildcards into the main draw:
 Marcelo Demoliner /  Rogério Dutra Silva
 André Sá /  João Souza

Champions

Singles 

  Pablo Cuevas def.  Luca Vanni, 6–4, 3–6, 7–6(7–4)

Doubles 

  Juan Sebastián Cabal /  Robert Farah def.  Paolo Lorenzi /  Diego Schwartzman, 6–4, 6–2

External links 
 

 
Brasil Open